Bummer and Lazarus were two stray dogs that roamed the streets of San Francisco, California, United States, in the early 1860s. Recognized for their unique bond and their prodigious rat-killing ability, they became a fixture of city newspapers, were exempted from local ordinances, and immortalized in cartoons.

Background
San Francisco, in common with other cities in the United States at the time, had a problem with free-ranging dogs. In Los Angeles in the 1840s, dogs outnumbered people by nearly two to one, and while the situation in San Francisco had not reached this extreme, the large numbers of strays and feral dogs did cause problems. Dogs were regularly poisoned or trapped and killed. Nevertheless, if a dog turned out to be a good ratter or distinguished itself in some other way, it was still possible for it to survive.

Biography

Meeting and career

Bummer was a black-and-white Newfoundland or Newfoundland cross who established himself outside the saloon of Frederick Martin in 1860 and quickly proved to be an exceptional rat-killer.  His ratting talent spared him the fate of the former owner of the territory, Bruno, who had been poisoned with strychnine shortly before Bummer's arrival. According to a 1901 retrospective published in the San Francisco Call, he had been owned by Ned Knight, a reporter for the Daily Alta California and had followed him to San Francisco from Petaluma. He scraped a living begging scraps from passers-by and the patrons of the saloon and other establishments along Montgomery Street.

In 1861 Bummer rescued another dog from a fight with a larger canine opponent. The rescued dog was badly injured, with a deep wound on his leg, and was not expected to live. Bummer coaxed him to eat, brought back scraps from his scavenging missions and huddled next to him to keep him warm during the night. The injured dog quickly recovered and within days was following Bummer as he made his begging rounds in the streets. His remarkable recovery earned him the name Lazarus, and he proved to be an even more prodigious ratter than Bummer. As a team they turned out to be exceptional, once finishing off 85 rats in 20 minutes. 

Their ratting talent and unique bond was seized upon by the city's press. Martin's saloon was a favorite haunt of newspapermen and journalists, so, with the dogs a fixture outside the bar, they never had to travel far for a story. The exploits of the dogs were recorded in detail in the Californian, Daily Alta California, Daily Morning Call, and Daily Evening Bulletin,  the editors vying with each other in their attempts to endow the pair's adventures with thrills and parallels to the human condition. Bummer was portrayed as the gentleman down on his luck, yet still faithful and conscientious, while Lazarus, the mongrel, was cast in the role of the sly and self-serving fair-weather friend. When Bummer was shot in the leg after only a couple of months, and Lazarus left him to run with another dog, it suited the press no end: Bummer was said to be feeling the sting of ingratitude at the desertion of the cur he had saved from death. Lazarus' return when Bummer recovered only added to the excitement. 

The two dogs had the run of the streets, and when, on June 14, 1862, Lazarus was taken by a new dog catcher, a mob of angry citizens demanded his release, petitioning to have the pair declared city property so they could wander the streets unmolested. The city supervisors released Lazarus and declared he and Bummer were exempt from the city ordinance against strays. A week later the two were reported to have stopped a runaway horse. Despite their reputations, the two could be vicious: Bummer was a sheep killer and regularly fought other dogs in the street, occasionally assisted by Lazarus (although normally Lazarus would restrict himself to barking encouragement). They also ransacked shops when they had entered unnoticed and had been locked in by the owners.

Emperor Norton

The two dogs were sometimes seen in the company of the "Emperor of the United States", the eccentric Joshua A. Norton (Emperor Norton I, Protector of Mexico), and a popular legend made him their owner. However, no contemporary records make any mention of Norton being the owner and only one newspaper report made any connection between him and the dogs. The rumour may have arisen because the cartoonist Edward Jump frequently featured the three together, most notably in The Three Bummers which showed His Imperial Majesty eating from a heavily laden buffet table while the dogs wait patiently for scraps. The Emperor was apparently outraged when he saw the picture displayed in a shop-front window: the imperial dignity was affronted by the depiction of His Majesty in the company of lowly dogs. Despite the apparent antipathy felt by the Emperor for the dogs, the close association was still being claimed in the 1950s:

Death of Lazarus

Lazarus was killed in October 1863. In the San Francisco Kaleidoscope, Dickson claimed he was kicked by the horse of one of the city's fire engines, but contemporary accounts say he was poisoned by being given meat laced with "ratbane" after biting a boy. San Franciscans put up a $50 reward for the capture of the poisoner. A wit suggested that Lazarus be buried in a place of honour alongside other great men of the city. Jump produced a cartoon of his "Funeral" with Emperor Norton as the Pope performing the ceremony and Freddy Coombs—another San Francisco eccentric who claimed to be the reincarnation of George Washington—digging the grave. Notable San Franciscans formed the cortège and Bummer looked on mournfully. This may have led to the rumour that large numbers of San Franciscans turned out for Lazarus' funeral. The dog was not buried though, but stuffed by a taxidermist and displayed behind the bar in Martin's saloon. (According to Dickson, Martin paid the taxidermist $50 to turn the dog over—even though its remains had already been claimed by the city council.) The Daily Evening Bulletin featured a long obituary entitled "Lament for Lazarus" in which they praised the virtues of both dogs and recounted their various adventures together.

Death of Bummer

Bummer continued alone, although Mark Twain reported a year later in the Daily Morning Call that he had taken a small black puppy under his wing. Nothing more was heard of the puppy and without his companion, Lazarus, Bummer was of less interest to the press. He died a lingering death in November 1865 after being kicked by a drunk, Henry Rippey. Bummer was still popular enough that, to avoid violence, the city immediately arrested Rippey. He also did not escape popular justice: on learning of his crime, his cellmate, David Popley, "popped him in the smeller".

Bummer's passing did not make the headlines in the same way that Lazarus' death had, but Jump created a new cartoon showing him lying in state while Lazarus tucked into a table of food in the ether above him and rats paid their respects. Mark Twain produced a eulogy for him in the Virginia City Enterprise which was reprinted in the Californian on 11 November 1865:

Bummer was also mounted by the taxidermist and placed on display. In 1906, both specimens were donated to the Golden Gate Park museum (now the M. H. de Young Memorial Museum) where they remained in storage until they were destroyed in 1910.

On 28 March 1992, E Clampus Vitus placed a brass plaque commemorating the two dogs at Transamerica Redwood Park, a small park adjacent to the base of the Transamerica Pyramid.

See also
 List of individual dogs
 Emperor Norton I, Protector of Mexico

References

Bibliography 
 
 
 

Individual dogs
19th century in San Francisco
1863 animal deaths
1865 animal deaths